Sincerely Yours is a Gothenburg-based independent record label formed in 2005 by the Swedish electronic pop duo The Tough Alliance. The duo created the record label after they left their former label Service. The Tough Alliance began by releasing their own music but has since then signed and released music from many different acts then themselves.

Besides releasing music, the record label has a history of releasing high end products such as bulletproof vests, armlets, wine, shirts and jackets. Every product, as with most of their vinyl releases, are sold in a limited edition.

Bands and artists
Nordpolen
jj
Kendal Johansson
CEO
Team Rockit
Merely

Discography

References

External links
Official Website

Swedish independent record labels